Guilford High School is a high school located in Rockford, Illinois, United States.  Guilford High School is one of four public high schools of the Rockford Public School District 205, along with Auburn, East, and Jefferson.

Notable alumni
 Carlos Polk, former NFL player
 Rick Nielsen, Tom Petersson and Bun E. Carlos of Cheap Trick.
 Alexi McCammond, political journalist
 Emily Bear, musician

References

External links
 Official website

High schools in Rockford, Illinois
Public high schools in Illinois
Educational institutions established in 1963
1963 establishments in Illinois